Raggedy Ann and Raggedy Andy is a two-reel cartoon produced by Fleischer Studios and released on April 11, 1941. It was co-written by Johnny Gruelle's son, Worth. It was the first Paramount cartoon to feature Raggedy Ann. This cartoon marks the only appearances of her brother Raggedy Andy and The Camel with the Wrinkled Knees. The cartoon depicts Raggedy Ann and Andy as sweethearts as opposed to siblings in the books.

Summary
The story of Raggedy Ann and Raggedy Andy begins when a little girl in a toy shop sees two rag dolls whose hands are sewn together. Because she could not afford to purchase both dolls, and because she really preferred the "beautiful girl doll", she asked the toyshop owner if he would be willing to unstitch the hands so that she could buy "the beautiful girl doll". Turning down the little girl's request, the owner explained to her the reason behind his refusal.

One evening in Ragland, sentient needles, threads, scissors, paintbrushes, and other creative implements came together and created a Girl Rag Doll and a Boy Rag Doll. When Paintbrush had completed the dolls' faces, he gave each of them a magic candy heart, bringing them to life, and then informed them that they needed to visit the Castle of Names before sunset.

After leaving the workshop, the rag dolls met The Camel with the Wrinkled Knees who offered to take them to the castle; but on their way to the Castle, the Boy Rag Doll fell under the spell of a beautiful Spanish doll, causing poor Girl Rag Doll's candy heart to break.

When the Girl Rag Doll was taken to the castle's hospital, she learned that the doctors were unable to treat broken hearts, so the Camel rushed out to find the Boy Rag Doll, who happened to be in "Glover's Land" with the beautiful Spanish doll. The beautiful Spanish doll asked the rag boy's name, but when he told her he did not have one, she rejected him saying, "without a name, you are just a nobody".

The Camel arrived and gave the boy rag doll a ride to the Castle where he applied for a name. When the Boy Rag Doll finally found the Girl Rag Doll in her hospital room in a broken-hearted sleep, he revealed a Naming Certificate showing that they were named "Raggedy Ann" and "Andy". After telling her how much he loved her in song, she woke up and hugged him.  
 
Raggedy Ann and Raggedy Andy skipped down the Castle's wedding aisle where they had their hands sewn together so they would never again be separated.

The story ends with the little girl sadly understanding why the dolls could not be sold separately; she turned to leave for home, but the toyshop owner stopped her and said, "Just because I cannot sell you one doll, does not mean I can not give you both of them". He handed both dolls to the  grateful little girl; she thanked the man and walked home while Raggedy Ann and Andy followed her, lovingly embracing one another.

Voices 
 Jack Mercer as Paint Brush
 Joy Terry as Raggedy Ann
 Bernie Fleischer as Raggedy Andy
 Pinto Colvig as Camel
 Johnny Rogers as Singer

References

External links
 

1940s English-language films
1941 animated films
1941 short films
1940s animated short films
Paramount Pictures short films
Fleischer Studios short films
Short films directed by Dave Fleischer
Films about toys
Films based on toys
Films about dolls
Raggedy Ann
American animated short films
1940s American films